A tintype, also known as a melainotype or ferrotype, is a photograph made by creating a direct positive on a thin sheet of metal coated with a dark lacquer or enamel and used as the support for the photographic emulsion. Tintypes enjoyed their widest use during the 1860s and 1870s, but lesser use of the medium persisted into the early 20th century and it has been revived as a novelty and fine art form in the 21st.

Tintype portraits were at first usually made in a formal photographic studio, like daguerreotypes and other early types of photographs, but later they were most commonly made by photographers working in booths or the open air at fairs and carnivals, as well as by itinerant sidewalk photographers. Because the lacquered iron support (there is no actual tin used) was resilient and did not need drying, a tintype could be developed and fixed and handed to the customer only a few minutes after the picture had been taken.

The tintype photograph saw more uses and captured a wider variety of settings and subjects than any other photographic type of the period. It was introduced while the daguerreotype was still popular, though its primary competition would have been the ambrotype.

The tintype saw the Civil War come and go, documenting the individual soldier and horrific battle scenes. It captured scenes from the Wild West, as it was easy to produce by itinerant photographers working out of covered wagons.

It began losing artistic and commercial ground to higher quality albumen prints on paper in the mid-1860s, yet survived for well over another 40 years, living mostly as a carnival novelty. The tintype's immediate predecessor, the ambrotype, was done by the same process of using a sheet of glass as the support. The glass was either of a dark color or provided with a black backing so that, as with a tintype, the underexposed negative image in the emulsion appeared as a positive. Tintypes were sturdy and did not require mounting in a protective hard case like ambrotypes and daguerreotypes.

Technical details 

There are two historic tintype processes: wet and dry. In the wet process, a collodion emulsion containing suspended silver halide crystals had to be formed on the plate just before it was exposed in the camera while still wet. Chemical treatment then reduced the crystals to microscopic particles of metallic silver in proportion to the intensity and duration of their exposure to light, resulting in a visible image. The later and more convenient dry process was similar but used a gelatin emulsion which could be applied to the plate long before use and exposed in the camera dry.

In both processes, a very underexposed negative image was produced in the emulsion. Its densest areas, corresponding to the lightest parts of the subject, appeared gray by reflected light. The areas with the least amount of silver, corresponding to the darkest areas of the subject, were essentially transparent and appeared black when seen against the dark background provided by the lacquer. The image as a whole therefore appeared to be a dull-toned positive. This ability to employ underexposed images allowed shorter exposure times to be used, a great advantage in portraiture.

To obtain as light-toned an image as possible, potassium cyanide was normally employed as the photographic fixer. It was perhaps the most acutely hazardous of all the several highly toxic chemicals originally used in this and many other early photographic processes.

One unusual piece of tintype equipment was a twelve-lensed camera that could make a dozen  "gem" portraits with one exposure, developed in 1858.

Each tintype is usually a camera original, so the image is usually a mirror image, reversed left to right from reality. Sometimes the camera was fitted with a mirror or right-angle prism so that the result would be right-reading.

History 

The process was first described by Adolphe-Alexandre Martin in France in 1853. In 1856 it was patented by Hamilton Smith in the United States and by William Kloen in the United Kingdom. It was first called melainotype, then ferrotype by V.M. Griswold of Ohio, a rival manufacturer of the iron plates, then finally tintype.

Ambrotype as a precursor 
The ambrotype was the first use of the wet-plate collodion process as a positive image. Such collodion glass positives had been invented by Frederick Scott Archer in 1851. Although it is a widely held belief James Ambrose Cutting might have named the process after himself, in actuality, "ambrotype" was first coined by Marcus Aurelius Root, a well known daguerreotypist, in his gallery as documented in the 1864 book The Camera and the Pencil.

The tintype was essentially a variant of the ambrotype, replacing the latter's glass plate with a thin sheet of japanned iron (hence ferro). Ambrotypes often exhibit some flaking of their black back coating, cracking or detachment of the image-bearing emulsion layer, or other deterioration, but the image layer on a tintype has proven to be typically very durable.

Success of the tintype 

Compared to their most important predecessor, the daguerreotype, tintypes were not only very inexpensive, they were also relatively easy and quick to make. A photographer could prepare, expose, develop and varnish a tintype plate and have it ready for the customer in a few minutes. Although early tintypes were sometimes mounted in protective ornamental cases, like daguerreotypes and ambrotypes, uncased tintypes in simple paper mats were popular from the beginning. They were often later transferred into the precut openings provided in book-like photograph albums.

One or more hardy, lightweight, thin tintypes could be carried conveniently in a jacket pocket. They became very popular in the United States during the American Civil War. Although prints on paper (see cartes de visite and cabinet cards) soon displaced them as the most common type of photograph, the tintype process continued to enjoy considerable use throughout the 19th century and beyond, especially for casual portraiture by novelty and street photographers. Edward M. Estabrooke's book The Ferrotype and How to Make It (1872), and the introduction of low cost variants known as "Gem ferrotypes" helped to sustain the tintype's longevity.

Contemporary usage 

John Coffer, as profiled in a 2006 New York Times article, travels by horse-drawn wagon creating tintypes.

In 2013, California Air National Guard member and artist Ed Drew took the first tintypes in a war zone since the Civil War, when he photographed Air Force pilots serving in the Afghan War.

The contemporary photographer Victoria Will created a series of tintypes of Hollywood stars at the 2014 and 2015 Sundance Film Festivals, including portraits of Anne Hathaway, Nick Cave, and Ewan McGregor. The portraits were later published as a book.

Organisations such as the penumbra foundation still continue to use this technique, offering tintype photography sessions. Their work has been featured in the New York Times.

Ferrotyping 
Ferrotyping is a still current, finishing treatment applied to ordinary photographic prints made on glossy photographic paper to bring out its reflective properties. Newly processed, still-wet photographic prints and enlargements that have been made on glossy-type paper are squeegeed onto a polished metal plate called a ferrotyping plate. When they dry and split off due to slight shrinkage, they retain a highly reflective gloss. This is not an image-forming technique, despite the name being the same as for the old process.

See also 
 Albumen print
 Ambrotype
 Calotype
 Collodion process
 Daguerreotype

References

External links 

 Step by Step Wet Plate Photography
 Making a Photograph During the Brady Era
 Civil War Photographs from the National Archive
 Tintypes Collection at the American Antiquarian Society
 Tintype street camera
 American Large Plate Tintypes
 https://vimeo.com/64989295

Photographic processes dating from the 19th century
Alternative photographic processes